Ondřej Rudzan (born 25 July 1998) is a Czech professional footballer who plays as a centre-back for MFK Skalica in the [[Slovak

Club career

MFK Skalica
He made his professional Fortuna Liga debut for MFK Skalica on 17 July 2022 against MFK Ružomberok.

References

External links
 MFK Skalica official club profile 
 
 
 Futbalnet profile 

1998 births
Living people
Czech footballers
Association football defenders
FK Mladá Boleslav players
FK Varnsdorf players
MFK Skalica players
Czech National Football League players
2. Liga (Slovakia) players
Slovak Super Liga players
Expatriate footballers in Slovakia
Czech expatriate sportspeople in Slovakia